Diane MacKown, also known as Diana MacKown is an American photographer. Her work is included in the collections of the Whitney Museum of American Art, the Metropolitan Museum of Art and the National Portrait Gallery, London.

MacKown was for many years an assistant to Louise Nevelson. After Nevelson died, she became involved in a contentious dispute with Nevelson's son over the ownership of a number of Nevelson's statues.

References

Living people
20th-century American photographers
20th-century American women artists
Year of birth missing (living people)
21st-century American women